James Tinney ( – June 12, 1988) was an African-American historian and minister who specialized in African-American history, specifically religious and political movements. He also founded Faith Temple, a Black LGBT congregation in Washington DC.

He received his Ph.D. in 1978 from Howard University, where he would go on to teach before his death.

Tinney founded the first scholarly journal about Black Pentecostalism, Spirit: A Journal of Issues Incident in Black Pentecostalism.

He died in 1988 at the age of 46 from AIDS complications.

References

Sources
Yvonne Patricia Chireau.  Black Majic. p. 193

Howard University alumni
1988 deaths